NCBA Bank Uganda Limited (commonly called NCBA Bank Uganda or shortened to NCBU), is a commercial bank in Uganda. It is one of the commercial banks licensed by the Bank of Uganda, the country's central bank and national banking regulator.

Overview
NCBA Bank Uganda is a retail financial services provider in Uganda, focusing on meeting the banking needs of small and medium enterprises and large corporations. , the total assets of the bank were valued at UGX:548 billion (US$149 million). The bank is a wholly owned subsidiary of the NCBA Group Plc, headquartered in Nairobi, Kenya, with subsidiaries in Kenya, Tanzania, Rwanda, Ivory Coast and Uganda.

History
The bank was founded in 2012 as NC Bank Uganda and received a commercial banking license from the Bank of Uganda in April 2012. The bank opened for business in May 2012.

In September 2019, the two parent companies of NC Bank Uganda and Commercial Bank of Africa (Uganda), both based in Kenya, received regulatory approval to merge their businesses, thereby merging their subsidiaries in Uganda to form NCBA Bank Uganda, effective 1 October 2019, subject to the approval of the Bank of Uganda.

In June 2020, Bank of Uganda gave consent for the merger of NC Bank Uganda with CBA Uganda. The merger process is expected to be complete by 31 September 2020. The combined bank had total assets of USh548 billion, (approx. US$149 million), as of 31 March 2020.

Management
Anthony Ndegwa, formerly managing director of CBA Uganda Limited, was appointed managing director of NCBA Bank Uganda, effective June 2020. In December 2020, Anthony Ndegwa left the bank and Mark Muyobo was appointed as managing director and CEO, in acting capacity.

Branches
As of July 2020, the bank maintained networked branches at the following locations:

 Nakasero Branch: Rwenzori House, Nakasero Road, Nakasero, Kampala Main Branch
 Bugoloobi Branch: 2nd Floor, Village Mall, Bugoloobi, Kampala 
 Market Plaza Branch: Market Street, Kampala.
 Kafu Road Branch - Twed Towers, 10 Kafu Road, Nakasero, Kampala.

See also
Banking in Uganda
List of banks in Uganda
Economy of Uganda

References

External links
Website of NCBA Group Plc
Website of NCBA Bank Uganda
Website of NCBA Bank Kenya

NCBA Group Plc
Banks of Uganda
Banks established in 2012
Companies based in Kampala
2012 establishments in Uganda